Minuscule 264 (in the Gregory-Aland numbering), ε 284 (Soden), is a Greek minuscule manuscript of the New Testament, on parchment. Paleographically it has been assigned to the 12th century. It has marginalia.

Description 

The codex contains the text of the four Gospels on 294 parchment leaves, with some lacunae. The text is written in one column per page, in 20 lines per page.

There is also a division according to the Ammonian Sections (in Mark 236 sections, the last section in 16:12), with references to the Eusebian Canons (written below Ammonian Section numbers).

 Lacunae 
 Matthew 1:1-7:14; 14:31-15:24; 15:37-16:24; 17:8-18:7; Luke 18:17-30; John 5:23-36; 6:69-7:12; 21:23-25. 
 Mark 8:27-10:35; Luke 9:52-11:36 were added by a later hand.

Text 

The Greek text of the codex is a representative of the Byzantine text-type. Aland placed it in Category V. According to the Claremont Profile Method it represents textual family in Kx in Luke 1 and Luke 20. In Luke 10 it represents Πa.

In John 8:6 it contains the addition: ενος εκαστου αυτων τας αμαρτιας. This textual variant appears in some Latin manuscripts. U (030), Minuscule 73, 331, 364, 700, 782, 1592 and some Armenian manuscripts have this variant in John 8:8.

History 

The manuscript was brought from the East in 1718 by Paul Lucas. The manuscripts was added to the list of New Testament manuscripts by Scholz (1794-1852).
It was examined and described by Paulin Martin. C. R. Gregory saw the manuscript in 1885.

The manuscript is currently housed at the Bibliothèque nationale de France (Gr. 65) at Paris.

See also 

 List of New Testament minuscules
 Biblical manuscript
 Textual criticism

References

Further reading 

 Jean-Pierre-Paul Martin, Description technique des manuscrits grecs, relatif au Nouveau Testament, conservé dans les bibliothèques des Paris (Paris 1883), p. 56

Greek New Testament minuscules
12th-century biblical manuscripts
Bibliothèque nationale de France collections